Kyron Thomas Stabana (born 27 August 1998) is an English professional footballer who plays for Melton Town in the  where he plays as a defender.

Playing career

Derby County
Stabana joined Derby County aged 7 as a striker. He was converted to a left and right winger aged 11 before eventually moving to right back at 14 years old. This turned out to be a good change for Stabana earning himself a scholarship at the club at 15 years old.

Stabana represented England U17s five times during his scholarship at the club, getting one assist. He signed his first professional contract with the club aged 17. He then had loan spells at Boston United and Tamworth. He was released by Derby County at the age of 19 following his second year as a professional footballer at the club.

AFC Wimbledon
Following his departure from Derby County, Stabana was announced as an AFC Wimbledon player on 30 August 2018 by under-23 development squad manager Alan Reeves, following a successful two-week trial.

Stabana had a two-month loan spell at Tamworth at the end of the 2018/19 season, featuring seven times.

Stabana made his debut for AFC Wimbledon, on 3 September 2019, in a Football League Trophy fixture at home to Brighton & Hove Albion U21's, which the away team won 2–0, Stabana played the full match.

Stabana played again in the Football League Trophy on 8 October 2019, in a home fixture against Leyton Orient, the home side won 3–0, and Kyron came on as a 60th minute substitute for Scott Wagstaff.

Cork City (loan)
Manager Neale Fenn signed Stabana for Cork City on 27 January 2020, on an initial loan deal until June 2020.

He made his debut for the club on the opening day of the season, in a 0–1 loss against Shelbourne playing the full 90 minutes on 14 February 2020.

Stabana made 4 appearances for Cork City, before the season was halted in mid-March due to the COVID-19 pandemic in the Republic of Ireland. Stabana returned to AFC Wimbledon, and the club confirmed on 10 June 2020, that the player would be released on the expiry of his contract.

Tamworth
On 19 September 2020, Stabana was announced as signing for Southern League Premier Division Central side Tamworth following a successful trial period. He made his debut the same day as Tamworth drew 1–1 away at Peterborough Sports on the opening day of the season.

Barwell
Stabana made the move to Southern League Premier Central rivals Barwell.  He made his debut for Barwell on 14 August 2021, in an away fixture against Lowestoft Town, and helped his new side to a 3-0 victory.

Career statistics

Club

References

External links

1998 births
Living people
English footballers
Association football defenders
Derby County F.C. players
Boston United F.C. players
Tamworth F.C. players
AFC Wimbledon players
Cork City F.C. players
Barwell F.C. players
English Football League players
Footballers from Leicester
League of Ireland players
Expatriate association footballers in the Republic of Ireland